Jacek Aleksander Hugo-Bader (born 9 March 1957 in Sochaczew) is a Polish reporter and journalist fascinated by Russia and the former Soviet Republics. Since 1990 he has worked for the Gazeta Wyborcza newspaper.

Life and career
He also used to work as a teacher, train loader, scale operator at a pig market, head of a distribution company, a part of the underground structure of Solidarity and a shopkeeper.

He travelled by bike through Central Asia, the Gobi Desert and China, and sailed through Lake Baikal in a canoe. In winter 2007 he made a lonely car journey from Moscow to Vladivostok which was the background of his first book White Fever: A Journey to the Frozen Heart of Siberia.

In 2011 he made a solitary hitchhike across Russia – from Magadan to Yakutsk. Reports describing encountered people's everyday lives were published in Gazeta Wyborcza during the journey and later gathered and released in the book Kolyma Diaries: A Journey into Russia's Haunted Hinterland.

He is a two-time laureate of Polish prize for the best journalists - Grand Press (in 1999 and 2003).
Most of his works are about Russia: "(...) he describes the imperium from prospect of loitering dog, grasps mechanisms of thinking, behaviour, processes and a rat by its tail it addition."

The journalist appeared in blackface at a Polish Independence Day celebration on November 11, 2016 as part of a reporting project on street reactions to a black person.

Books
 White Fever: A Journey to the Frozen Heart of Siberia (pol. Biała gorączka) (2009)
 (pol.) W rajskiej dolinie wśród zielska (2002)
 Kolyma Diaries: A Journey into Russia's Haunted Hinterland (pol. Dzienniki kołymskie) (2011)
 (pol.) Chłopcy z motylkami (2013)
 (pol.) Długi film o miłości. Powrót na Broad Peak (2014)
 (pol.) Skucha (2016)

Films
 Jacek Hugo-Bader. Korespondent z Polszy (2007)
 Jak to się robi by Marcel Łoziński (2006)
 Zamek - series Nasz spis powszechny (2002)
 Ślad po meduzie (1998)

References

External links
 Interview by Andrew Jack translated by Antonia Lloyd-Jones  (2014)

1957 births
Living people
Polish reporters and correspondents
Polish travel writers
People from Sochaczew